Itaberaba is a municipality in the state of Bahia in the North-East region of Brazil.

The population in 2020 was 64,646.

History
Before the arrival of Europeans, the area covered by the modern municipality was inhabited by "Maracás Indians" of the "Tapuias" subgroup, believed to have been strong fighters but not cannibals.

In 1768 the São Simão farmstead was established here by Captain Manuel Rodrigues Cajado.

More recently the area has become known as a center for pineapples.

See also
List of municipalities in Bahia

References

Municipalities in Bahia